The 2012 All-Big Ten Conference football team consists of American football players chosen as All-Big Ten Conference players for the 2012 Big Ten Conference football season.  The conference recognizes two official All-Big Ten selectors: (1) the Big Ten conference coaches selected separate offensive and defensive units and named first- and second-team players (the "Coaches" team); and (2) a panel of sports writers and broadcasters covering the Big Ten also selected offensive and defensive units and named first- and second-team players (the "Media" team).

Offensive selections

Quarterbacks
 Taylor Martinez, Nebraska (Coaches-1; Media-2)
 Braxton Miller, Ohio State (Coaches-2; Media-1)

Running backs
 Montee Ball, Wisconsin (Coaches-1; Media-1)
 Le'Veon Bell, Michigan State (Coaches-1; Media-1)
 Ameer Abdullah, Nebraska (Coaches-2)
 Venric Mark, Northwestern (Coaches-2)
 Carlos Hyde, Ohio State (Coaches-2)

Receivers
 Allen Robinson, Penn State (Coaches-1; Media-1)
 Jared Abbrederis, Wisconsin (Coaches-1; Media-1)
 Kenny Bell, Nebraska (Coaches-2; Media-2)
 Corey Brown, Ohio State (Coaches-2) 
 Cody Latimer, Indiana (Media-2)

Centers
 Matt Stankiewitch, Penn State (Coaches-1; Media-2)
 Travis Frederick, Wisconsin (Media-1)
 James Ferentz, Iowa (Coaches-2)

Guards
 Spencer Long, Nebraska (Coaches-1; Media-1)
 John Urschel, Penn State (Coaches-1; Media-2)
 Patrick Omameh, Michigan (Coaches-1)
 Andrew Norwell, Ohio State (Media-1)
 Ryan Groy, Wisconsin (Coaches-2)
 Brian Mulroe, Northwestern (Media-2)

Tackles
 Taylor Lewan, Michigan (Coaches-1; Media-1)
 Rick Wagner, Wisconsin (Coaches-1; Media-1)
 Jeremiah Sirles, Nebraska (Coaches-2; Media-2)
 Hugh Thornton, Illinois (Coaches-2)
 Jack Mewhort, Ohio State (Media-2)

Tight ends
 Jacob Pedersen, Wisconsin (Coaches-1)
 Kyle Carter, Penn State (Media-1)
 Dion Sims, Michigan State (Coaches-2; Media-2)

Defensive selections

Defensive linemen

 John Simon, Ohio State (Coaches-1; Media-1)

 Jordan Hill, Penn State (Coaches-1; Media-1)

 Kawann Short, Purdue (Coaches-1; Media-1)

 Johnathan Hankins, Ohio State (Coaches-1; Media-2)

 Eric Martin, Nebraska (Coaches-2; Media-1)

 Adam Replogle, Indiana (Coaches-2; Media-2)

 Michael Buchanan, Illinois (Coaches-2)

 Craig Roh, Michigan (Coaches-2)

 Baker Steinkuhler, Nebraska (Coaches-2)

 William Gholston, Michigan State (Media-2)

 D.L. Wilhite, Minnesota (Media-2)

Linebackers

 Michael Mauti, Penn State (Coaches-1; Media-1)

 Max Bullough, Michigan State (Coaches-1; Media-2)

 Ryan Shazier, Ohio State (Coaches-2; Media-1)

 Chris Borland, Wisconsin (Coaches-1)

 Mike Taylor, Wisconsin (Media-1)

 Gerald Hodges, Penn State (Coaches-2; Media-2)

 Will Compton, Nebraska (Coaches-2)

 Jake Ryan, Michigan (Media-2)

Defensive backs

 Micah Hyde, Iowa (Coaches-1; Media-1)

 Bradley Roby, Ohio State (Coaches-1; Media-1)

 Johnny Adams, Michigan State (Coaches-1; Media-2)

 Darqueze Dennard, Michigan State (Coaches-1; Media-2)

 Daimion Stafford, Nebraska (Coaches-2; Media-1)

 Travis Howard, Ohio State (Media-1)

 Jordan Kovacs, Michigan (Coaches-2)

 Christian Bryant, Ohio State (Coaches-2)

 Ricardo Allen, Purdue (Coaches-2)

 Josh Johnson, Purdue (Media-2)

 Devin Smith, Wisconsin (Media-2)

Special teams

Kickers
 Jeff Budzien, Northwestern (Coaches-1; Media-2)
 Brett Maher, Nebraska (Coaches-2; Media-1)

Punter
 Mike Sadler, Michigan State (Coaches-1; Media-2)
 Brett Maher, Nebraska (Coaches-2)
 Will Hagerup, Michigan (Media-1)

Key

See also
 2012 College Football All-America Team

References

All-Big Ten Conference
All-Big Ten Conference football teams